The 1956 World Table Tennis Championships men's doubles was the 23rd edition of the men's doubles championship.
Ichiro Ogimura and Yoshio Tomita won the title after defeating Ivan Andreadis and Ladislav Štípek in the final by three sets to nil.

Results

See also
List of World Table Tennis Championships medalists

References

-